The Ahlus Sunnah Wal Jamaah Association of Australia (ASWJA) was founded by Melbourne sheikh Mohammed Omran. Ahlus Sunnah Wal Jamaah is a generic term referring to Sunni Islam. Those who adopt it as organisational name do so as adherents of the Salafi movement in Australia, US, UK, and Canada.

Overview
ASWJA which is said to be both organised and influential, runs a number of programs for the community and for young people, with its followers striving to emulate Islam at time of Muhammad.

The organisation is alleged to have established ties with Jemaah Islamiah and al-Qaeda.

ASWJA is linked with the Islamic Information & Support Centre of Australia.

The organisation supports Australian Muslim preacher Feiz Muhammad.  In 2007, Muhammad established the Dawah Central centre in Auburn, in a building, subsequently purchased in 2011 by the ASWJA, located behind the Bukhari House bookshop.

ASWJA is associated with the Hume Islamic Youth Centre (HIYC) in Melbourne, the Global Islamic Youth Centre (GIYC) in Sydney and the Bukhari House bookshop in Sydney. The Bukhari House bookshop has close links to Sydney's Street Dawah preaching group.  Members of the Street Dawah preaching group have died fighting for ISIS.

A young Melbourne man who attended HIYC, planned to launch a series of bombings across Melbourne, then travelled to Iraq where he carried out an Islamic State suicide bombing mission in which only he was killed.  Another terrorist, now deceased, was one of at least five fighters who grew up close to, or attended the HIYC.

Harun Mehicevic the leader of Melbourne's Al-Furqan Islamic Information Centre was a student of Sheik Abu Ayman. ASWJA provided the funds to establish the centre and installed Mehicevic as leader. There has been a subsequent falling-out between the groups.

In May 2015, Mustafa Abu Yusuf, a spokesman for the ASWJA described terrorism as a, "fabricated issue".

See also
Islam in Australia
Islamic organisations in Australia
Islamic schools and branches

References

External links
 Al-Furqan Islamic Centre 
 ASWJA website
  Bukhari House
 Spears Sports Club

Islam in Australia
Salafi groups